The 1975 Western Championships, also known as the Cincinnati Open, was a men's tennis tournament played on outdoor hard courts at the Sunlite Swim and Tennis Club at Old Coney in Cincinnati, Ohio in the United States that was part of the 1975 Commercial Union Assurance Grand Prix. It was the 75th edition of the tournament and was held from July 29 through August 3, 1975. Seventh-seeded Tom Gorman won the singles title.

Finals

Singles
 Tom Gorman defeated  Sherwood Stewart 7–5, 2–6, 6–4
 It was Gorman's 1st singles title of the year and the 4th of his career in the Open Era.

Doubles
 Phil Dent /  Cliff Drysdale defeated  Marcelo Lara /  Joaquín Loyo Mayo 7–6, 6–4

References

External links
 
 ITF tournament edition details
 ATP tournament profile

Cincinnati Open
Cincinnati Masters
Cincinnati Open
Cincin
Cincinnati Open
Cincinnati Open